Tom Sandberg (14 September 1953 – 5 February 2014) was a Norwegian art photographer.

Life and work
Sandberg was born in Narvik, but grew up in the Grorud Valley in eastern Oslo. In the early 1970s, he studied photography at Trent Polytechnic, Nottingham, England.

He worked as a photographer from the 1970s. According to Juxtapoz, with his "signature modulating gray scale", he made photographs of "the everyday—dark abstractions of asphalt and sea, the hard edges of an automobile, an ominously curved tunnel, an anonymous figure casting a shadow ... His pictures are subtle yet transformative, studies of stillness that radiate mystery."

Publications
Fotografier. Oslo: Oktober, 1995. .
Tom Sandberg – Photography. Oslo: Astrup Fearnley Museet for Moderne Kunst, 2000. .
Tom Sandberg: Photographs. New York: Aperture, 2022. .

Films
Bortenfor språket/Beyond language (NRK, 2000) – by Nils Petter Lotherington

Solo exhibitions
Tom Sandberg: Photographs 1989–2006, MoMA PS1, New York, 2007

Collections
Sandberg's work is held in the following permanent collections:
Moderna Museet, Stockholm, Sweden: 5 prints (as of 6 January 2023)
National Museum of Art, Architecture and Design, Oslo, Norway: 61 objects (as of 6 January 2023)

References

External links
 

1953 births
2014 deaths
People from Narvik
Photographers from Oslo
Alumni of Nottingham Trent University